Marszałek is a Polish surname. It may refer to:
Franz Marszalek (1900–1975), German conductor and composer
Rudolf Marszałek (1911–1948), Polish priest
Lechosław Marszałek (1922–1991), Polish film director
Andrzej Marszałek (born 1970), Polish rower
Bernard Marszałek (1976–2007), Polish powerboat driver
John F. Marszalek, American historian
Joanna Marszałek-Kawa, Polish lawyer

Polish-language surnames